Brenda Bufalino (born September 7, 1937) is an American tap dancer and writer. She co-founded, choreographed and directed the American Tap Dance Foundation, known at the time as the American Tap Dance Orchestra. Bufalino wrote a memoir entitled, Tapping the Source...Tap dance, Stories, Theory and Practice and a book of poems Circular Migrations, both of which have been published by Codhill Press, and the novella Song of the Split Elm, published by Outskirts Press.

She has been awarded The Flobert Award, The Tapestry Award, The Tap City Hall of Fame Award, The Dance Magazine, and the Bessie Award, all for outstanding achievement and contributions to the field of tap dance.

Early life 
Bufalino was born September 7, 1937 in Swampscott, Massachusetts. Bufalino came from a family of performers, and started dancing seriously by age five at Professor O’Brien’s Normal School of Dancing six days out of the week. She trained in numerous styles, but tap was deeply instilled in her at a young age. As heard by Bufalino in an interview, “Where I come from, even if you intended a career in ballet, you studied tap first.” As a young girl, Bufalino toured with her mother and aunt in a performing act called The Strickland Sisters. The group combined music, with text and movement; Bufalino would dance while her mother and aunt sung Art Songs.

At age 15, Bufalino commuted to Boston to train at Stanley Brown’s Studio in the city. While at Stanley Brown, Bufalino trained in Afro-Cuban, rhythm tap, jazz, and vaudeville styles. Bufalino stayed in Boston, and danced underaged at bars with The Bobby Clark Dancers. In addition to dancing, each night she would sneak into these clubs after class and rehearsals to listen to the New Orleans jazz and bebop improvisation of saxophone players. Hayes and Bigfords Restaurant became the scene for avant-garde communities to meet and ended up giving Bufalino her first exposure to conversations over philosophy, literature, and art. Her years in Boston shaped her style through music that she loved and experienced in an intimate way that later impacted her tap style.

Career

New York City 
Bufalino left for New York City in 1955 to scour the jazz clubs. Shortly after moving, she began dancing at Dance Craft, a dance studio owned by the famous tap dancer, Honi Coles. At age 17, Coles took on Bufalino as his protégé. Bufalino became greatly inspired by Coles’ emphasis on melody and personality. She was eventually invited to perform with the Copasetics, which included tap legends such as Ernest "Brownie" Brown, Chuck Green, Jimmy Slyde and Howard “Sandman” Sims.

While training with Coles, Bufalino continued to stay active in a variety of training. She studied jazz from Matt Mattox, modern primitive and afro-cuban from Syvilla Fort, all the while being an active performer in the New York Vaudeville nightclub circuit. She became a popular Calypso artist, and in 1956 she premiered her act at Cafe Society, which led to more calypso work for the following two years. New York Cabaret laws of the 50’s changed live performance at the time, and many Cabarets ended up losing their venues. This, in conjunction with frustration over the direction of the industry, caused Bufalino to flee the confines of the city in 1965 and moved to New Paltz, NY. While in New Paltz with her husband, she raised her two children, Jebah Baum and Zachary Baum, and spent most of the late 60’s writing poetry and plays.

New Paltz and the Avant-garde 
While in New Paltz, Bufalino reconnected with Ed Summerlin, long time friend and composer who collaborated with her often. Summerlin and Bufalino created projects for the National Council of Church, and was very involved in avant-garde performance art. Though this work didn’t include tap, Bufalino would put tap sounds through a synthesizer and use it in her accompaniment. This period of her life was filled with experimentation, emphasis on interpretive dance, and led to Bufalino’s curiosity in how to combine her love for tap with the artistic world of concert art. At the same time, Bufalino began teaching at SUNY New Paltz as a professor. Her connection to the university opened up opportunities for  Bufalino to experiment and create modern works such as, Watch the Bouncing Ball, Diary of Samuel and Rosalie, and a film entitled, Traveling. Bufalino created a small company of dancers known as, The Dancing Theatre, and in 1978 Bufalino presented her first major showing of tap choreography at the Pilgrim Theatre titled, Singing, Swinging, and Winging. This piece consisted of three members of the company, with Honi Coles as a guest.

Resurgence of Tap 
Bufalino’s career peaked during the 80’s, and she found herself involved in many different artistic endeavors that spanned all across the globe. Bufalino’s work premiered in both small jazz clubs, such as the Blue Note, and large orchestral settings. After moving back to New York City, Bufalino and Coles reconnected and began working together again. Bufalino played a key role in Coles’ resurface in the tap industry in the 70’s. In the early 80’s she toured with Coles and the Copasetics internationally in London and France, including festivals produced by Avra Petrides in St. Chinian. This was Bufalino’s first exposure to any kind of art festival and led to later inspiration for tap festivals in America. In 1984, Bufalino performed Cantata and the Blues, a solo show that established her tap career further. This performance utilized counterpoint, weight, and complex rhythm.

During this time, Bufalino taught at many studios in NYC and internationally. Additionally, she became heavily involved in the tap festivals (Colorado, Portland, Boston, San Francisco, Houston) around America that were gaining immense popularity at the time. These teaching experiences lead Bufalino to solidify her pedagogy and bring tap dance to people all around America. Eventually, one of her company members, Tony Waag, created Tap City, a Tap festival that brought classes, performances, and tap seminars to New York City.

American Tap Dance Orchestra 
While performing at Blue Note as a soloist, touring with the Copasetics, and making appearances at tap festivals, Bufalino banded together a group of 11 dancers in 1986 to create the American Tap Dance Orchestra (later becoming American Tap Dance Foundation). The concept behind the orchestra was to use different groups of tappers to encompass the many sections of a band or orchestra. Some would be bass, others drums, with a soloist usually carrying the melody. They premiered their first work at the Statue of Liberty 4 July Festival in Battery Park. They later premiered a three and a half minute PBS special performance, Haitian Fight Song, which launched the company into stardom. Following this performance, the company premiered other iconic works such as 42nd Street River to River and The Four Seasons [Jazz version]. Touch, Turn, Return created in collaboration with Carmen Moore premiered in the Judson Church Theater, and is considered Bufalino’s most critically acclaimed avant-garde work. From 1989 to 1995, the company also operated Woodpeckers Tap Dance Center & Inter Arts Space in New York City, and presented on-going classes, performances and related activities. This space was not only for dance, but housed poetry nights, theatrical performances, art galleries, and musical concerts.

The company’s work had an iconoclastic aesthetic that put tap dance on the concert stage. Often appearing in black suits with coat tails, the dancers utilized counterpoint and cacophony in their tapping. Bufalino was very involved in arranging the composition and worked very closely with the musicians that played for their performances. As a director, she was keen on making sure the audience could hear the tappers. She was known to quiet the orchestra by muting the horns, and often played the drums herself so she could control the volume.

Legacy 
Recognized as a leading exponent and innovator of jazz tap dance, Bufalino was a pioneer in putting tap dance on the concert stage and challenging the audience to sustain its attention on prolonged rhythmic composition. As a choreographer, Bufalino emphasized story telling, arrangement, choice of composition, and writing in her work. She believed that, “The tap dancer should be integrated with the music.” She was influential in demanding quality microphones, wood floors, lighting, and proper technical needs for tap dancers in both their training and performances.  

Bufalino experienced backlash for being a white woman in the tap industry and spent her entire career getting producers and technicians to be on board with her work. Through the challenges, Bufalino’s work eventually created a pallet for how tap dance could be produced and appreciated on the concert stage. As a creator, her work pushed boundaries and blended different types of elements that were previously contrary ideals to the tap industry.

References

External links
Brenda Bufalino's official site
Biography on TapDance.Org
Library of Congress Performing Arts Encyclopedia

1937 births
Living people
American female dancers
American tap dancers
Artists from Boston
Musicians from Boston
Musicians from New York City
People from Swampscott, Massachusetts